Husky is a general term for several breeds of dog used as sled dogs, which are believed to have originated in Siberia.

Husky or huskie may also refer to:

University teams
 Connecticut Huskies, teams of the University of Connecticut
 Washington Huskies, teams of the University of Washington
 Husky Stadium
 Husky Ballpark
 Northern Illinois Huskies
 Huskie Stadium
 Northeastern Huskies
 Houston Baptist Huskies
 St. Cloud State Huskies
 Husky Stadium (St. Cloud)
 Saint Mary's Huskies
 Michigan Tech Huskies, Michigan Technological University
 Saskatchewan Huskies, the University of Saskatchewan, Canada

Sports teams
 Les Husky de Cowansville, a former junior "A" team based out of Cowansville, Quebec, Canada
 Durham Huskies (c. 1908–1992), a franchise based in Durham, Ontario, Canada
 Durham Huskies (1996–2001), a junior "A" team
 Fort St. John Huskies, a junior "B" team in British Columbia, Canada
 Halton Huskies, a junior "A" team in Stoney Creek, Ontario
 Onaping Falls Huskies, a junior "A" team in Ontario
 Rouyn-Noranda Huskies, part of the Quebec Major Junior Hockey League
 Steinbach Huskies, junior "C" and senior teams based in Steinbach, Manitoba, Canada
 Whitehorse Huskies, a Canadian senior "AAA" team out of Whitehorse, Yukon
 Houston Huskies, a minor league team based in Houston, Texas
 North Iowa Huskies, a junior team that was based in Mason City, Iowa
 Kassel Huskies, a German professional team based in Kassel
 Cardiff Huskies, a sledge hockey team based in Cardiff, Wales
 Toronto Huskies, a defunct basketball team
 Edmonton Huskies, a Canadian Junior Football team
 Huskies de Rouen, a French baseball team

Transportation

Aircraft
 Advanced Aviation Husky, an ultralight aircraft
 Aviat Husky, a two-seat, high-wing, utility light aircraft
 Beagle Husky, a three-seat British light aircraft built in the 1960s
 Fairchild F-11 Husky, a Canadian bush plane
 Kaman HH-43 Huskie, a helicopter used by the United States military from the 1950s to the 1970s 
 Kaman K-1125, a prototype civilian helicopter sometimes called the Huskie III

Civilian vehicles
 Hillman Husky, passenger car made 1954–1970
 A nickname for Husqvarna Motorcycles
 Buses run by Husky Tours in the Philippines

Military
 Husky VMMD (vehicle-mounted mine detector), formerly known as Chubby (mine detection system)
 International MXT-MV or Husky TSV, an armoured car
 Husky armoured recovery vehicle, used by the Canadian military beginning in the late 1970s

Maritime
 Husky (ship, 1959), see Boats of the Mackenzie River watershed

Places in Antarctica
 Husky Pass, Bowers Mountains
 Husky Dome, a snow dome in the Queen Maud Mountains
 Husky Heights, Queen Maud Mountains
 Husky Massif, a rock outcrop in the Prince Charles Mountains

Music
 Ferlin Husky (1925-2011), American singer
 S. Husky Höskulds, Grammy Award-winning audio engineer
 Husky (album), a studio album by Skerik's Syncopated Taint Septet released in 2006
 Husky (band), an Australian indie folk band
 Husky (rapper), (born 1993 in Ulan-Ude) a Russian hip hop performer

Businesses and products
 Husky Energy, an integrated energy company and chain of gas stations
 Husky (computer), a handheld microcomputer issued in 1981 
 Husky toys, a line of small die-cast toy vehicles
 Husky (tools), a tool brand of The Home Depot
 Husqvarna AB, sometimes known as Husky in English
 Husky, a tobacco brand of the U.S. Smokeless Tobacco Company
 For brands sometimes called "Husky" derived from Huskvarna, Sweden, see Husqvarna

Other uses
 Operation Husky, the Allied invasion of Sicily in World War II
 Husky (commentator), a Starcraft II commentator and broadcaster
 Husky the Muskie, an outdoor sculpture in Kenora, Ontario

See also
 Huskey (surname)
 Huskii (born 1992), Australian rapper and musician